This page lists, by year, the artists that have designed the label of the Château Mouton Rothschild. This wine introduced the concept of artist labels in the wine industry.

Background 
Baron Philippe de Rothschild came up with the idea of having each year's Château Mouton Rothschild label designed by a famous artist of the day. He started with Jean Carlu in 1924, but eventually dropped the idea when he faced a wave of critics regarding his novel idea. In 1946, this became a permanent and significant aspect of the Mouton image, but the illustrations were often informal, quickly drafted by the artists, sometimes on a table napkin. In 1955, Georges Braque asked to design the next wine's label, and the wine's label went on to be designed by famous international artists since then.

In the words of  Julien de Beaumarchais de Rothschild, “The artist must be like Mouton: an extremely well-known artist who does not need Mouton to promote his or her art”.

Once, on a trip to the USA, Philippine de Rothschild saw that wealthy collectors of Château Mouton Rothschild had enlarged the bottles' labels and were displaying them in their houses' hallway. This gave the idea to the Baroness to organize, starting in 1981, fully-fledged exhibitions of the wine labels. A permanent exhibition was created in 2013 at the château.

The popularity of the label images results in auction prices for older and more collectible years being far out of sync with the other first growths, whose labels do not change year to year.

List 
1924: Jean Carlu (the first time a commercial artist designed a wine label)
1945: Philippe Jullian ("The Year of Victory")
1946: Jean Hugo
1947: Jean Cocteau
1948: Marie Laurencin
1949: André Dignimont
1950: Arnulf
1951: Marcel Vertès
1952: Léonor Fini
1953: Centenary year commemoration
1954: Jean Carzou
1955: Georges Braque (first famous international artist to design the label)
1956: Pavel Tchelitchew
1957: André Masson
1958: Salvador Dalí
1959: Richard Lippold
1960: Jacques Villon
1961: Georges Mathieu
1962: Matta
1963: Bernard Dufour
1964: Henry Moore
1965: Dorothea Tanning
1966: Pierre Alechinsky
1967: César
1968: Bona
1969: Joan Miró
1970: Marc Chagall
1971: Wassily Kandinsky
1972: Serge Poliakoff
1973: Pablo Picasso (posthumous recognition – in memoriam, as he had died in Mougins in April of that year. Also the year Château Mouton Rothschild became first-growth)
1974: Robert Motherwell
1975: Andy Warhol
1976: Pierre Soulages
1977: Tribute to Queen Elizabeth The Queen Mother, who stayed at the chateau in April 1977
1978: Jean-Paul Riopelle (2 labels)
1979: Hisao Domoto
1980: Hans Hartung
1981: Arman
1982: John Huston
1983: Saul Steinberg
1984: Agam
1985: Paul Delvaux
1986: Bernard Séjourné
1987: Hans Erni
1988: Keith Haring
1989: Georg Baselitz
1990: Francis Bacon
1991: Setsuko
1992: Per Kirkeby
1993: Balthus (2 labels. The first label had been banned in the US because it depicted a naked young woman and the press kit explained "The fragile and mysterious girl . . . seems to hint at some secret promise of undiscovered pleasure, a pleasure to be shared")
1994: Karel Appel
1995: Antoni Tàpies
1996: Gu Gan
1997: Niki de Saint Phalle
1998: Rufino Tamayo
1999: Raymond Savignac
2000: Special gold enamel relief of the "Augsburg Ram" in the Mouton museum
2001: Robert Wilson
2002: Ilya Kabakov
2003: 150th Birthday Tribute
2004: Charles, Prince of Wales
2005: Giuseppe Penone
2006: Lucian Freud
2007: Bernar Venet
2008: Xu Lei
2009: Anish Kapoor
2010: Jeff Koons
2011: Guy de Rougemont
2012: Miquel Barcelo
2013: Lee Ufan
2014: David Hockney
2015: Gerhard Richter
2016: William Kentridge
2017: Annette Messager
2018: Xu Bing
2019: Olafur Eliasson

References

External links
 Images of Mouton labels from 1945–2013
 the company's site about the paintings

Bordeaux wine
Château Mouton Rothschild